Wentworth Gardens is a low rise 344-unit housing project operated by the Chicago Housing Authority (CHA). it lies just south of Guaranteed Rate Field in Bronzeville on Chicago's south side.

History 
The site had originally been home to South Side Park, a baseball stadium for the Chicago White Sox (1900-1910) and then the Chicago American Giants of the Negro Baseball League (1910-1940). In 1944, the HA purchased the site to build a 422-unit apartment complex of low-rise buildings and row houses. Wentworth Gardens opened in 1947 for returning World War II veterans and later thousands of low-income African American families in a tight-knit community. During the 1950s it was labeled as “The best housing community in the city," until street gangs moved in. By the early 1970s the project became more unsettling and less tended to by CHA as crime and drugs turned problematic. The Gangster Disciples controlled many buildings in Wentworth during the drug trade in the early 1990s under the leadership of Chuck Dorsey, whom also controlled Cabrini Green. The project was one of many CHA developments that was regularly swept by Chicago Housing Authority Police Department as it was apart of "Operation Clean Sweep."
In October 1996, police arrested 13 drug dealers in a drug sweep. 
By the early 2000s it was the nicknamed "Murdertown" due to the frequent homicides that occurred in the project. Residents blamed CHA for displacing families from the High-rises to Wentworth. The homicides was the end results of displacing some said.

Renovation
In 1999, HUD implemented HOPE VI hoping to ease the housing crisis. Originally, the program was aimed to rehabilitate public housing, but in practice it demolished and significantly reduced public housing units. By 2000, Chicago mayor Richard M. Daley launched his Plan for Transformation for Public Housing, in which all high-rise developments were to be demolished and replaced with smaller-scale, mixed-income developments. In 2004, thanks to Wentworth activists, the development avoided demolition and the units were slated for a complete renovation. Yet in order for the renovation to occur, 90 percent of the units had to be vacated, leading to a significant number of displaced families. The renovation was completed in 2007 and reduced the number of units from 422 to 344. The renovated buildings came equipped with new rehabilitated units and walkways but lacked a security system which was installed into other active CHA developments.

References

Neighborhoods in Chicago